Charles do Vale de Souza (born 2 July 1994) is a Brazilian professional footballer who plays as a forward for Spanish club Alondras CF.

Career
Born in São Paulo, Charles began his career with Campeonato Gaúcho side Caxias before moving to Denmark to play for Danish 1st Division side Vejle.

On 28 December 2016, Charles signed with Chennai City of India's I-League on loan from Portuguese side GDSC Alvarenga. He made his debut for the side on 8 January 2017 against Minerva Punjab. He started and played 82 minutes as Chennai City drew 0–0.He scored first goal against Aizawl FC From a penalty in the 89th minute He scored a total of four league goals and at the end of the season, he was awarded the club's player of the season award.

On 24 August 2017, Charles signed for East Bengal of the same league.

Career statistics

References

External links 

Charles at ZeroZero

1993 births
Living people
Footballers from São Paulo
Brazilian footballers
Brazilian expatriate footballers
Comercial Futebol Clube (Ribeirão Preto) players
Atlético Monte Azul players
Sociedade Esportiva e Recreativa Caxias do Sul players
Vejle Boldklub players
Chennai City FC players
East Bengal Club players
Danish 1st Division players
I-League players
Tercera División players
Association football forwards
Brazilian expatriate sportspeople in Denmark
Brazilian expatriate sportspeople in Portugal
Brazilian expatriate sportspeople in India
Brazilian expatriate sportspeople in Spain
Expatriate men's footballers in Denmark
Expatriate footballers in Portugal
Expatriate footballers in India
Expatriate footballers in Spain